John Lavery (24 November 1919 – 30 January 1997) was a Northern Irish professional footballer who played as a left winger.

Career
Born in Belfast, Lavery signed for Bradford City in June 1948, leaving the club in September 1948 to play for Halifax Town. He began his career with Glentoran and Dundalk.

He played for Northern Ireland Schools and the League of Ireland XI.

During his time with Bradford City he made five appearances in the Football League.

During his time with Halifax he made three appearances in the Football League, scoring once.

He ended his career back in Northern Ireland with Linfield.

He died in Belfast on 30 January 1997.

Sources

References

1919 births
1997 deaths
Association footballers from Northern Ireland
Glentoran F.C. players
Dundalk F.C. players
Bradford City A.F.C. players
Halifax Town A.F.C. players
Linfield F.C. players
League of Ireland players
English Football League players
Association football wingers